David Allan Goltz (born June 23, 1949) is a former professional baseball player who pitched in the Major Leagues from 1972 to 1983.

Biography

Dave Goltz attended high school in Rothsay, Minnesota where he was a multi-sport star athlete. Goltz signed with the Twins organization out of high school for $20,000.  He began his career with the Twins in the Gulf Coast Rookie League in 1967 and moved up to single-A St. Cloud in 1968.  He served in the U.S. Army Reserves as a helicopter mechanic and his unit was called to active duty in 1969, postponing his baseball career.  He returned to the minors after his Army obligation in 1970 and hurt his arm in AA.  After rehab, he spent 1971 with two single-A teams, going a combined 14–3 with Orlando and Lynchburg.  He moved to AAA Tacoma in 1972 and was called up to the majors in July 1972 when Jim Kaat went on the disabled list.  He won his first Major League start against the Milwaukee Brewers.

After going 6-4 his rookie season, Goltz had three consecutive seasons of .500 records, 8–8 in 1974 and back-to-back 14–14 seasons in 1975 and 1976.  In 1977, Goltz won a career-high 20 games for the Twins and tied with Dennis Leonard and Jim Palmer for most wins in the American League.

Goltz appeared in the 1981 World Series as a member of the Dodgers.

See also
 List of Major League Baseball annual wins leaders

References

External links

1949 births
Living people
Minnesota Twins players
Los Angeles Dodgers players
California Angels players
Major League Baseball pitchers
Baseball players from Minnesota
People from Pelican Rapids, Minnesota
American League wins champions
Gulf Coast Twins players
St. Cloud Rox players
Florida Instructional League Twins players
Orlando Twins players
Charlotte Hornets (baseball) players
Lynchburg Twins players
Tacoma Twins players
United States Army soldiers